Hugo Lennox (born 6 March 1999) is an Irish rugby union player who plays for the Ireland national rugby sevens team.

Lennox debuted with the Ireland national sevens team in September 2018. He also represented Ireland at the 2019 London Sevens where he started four of the six matches, and the team finished sixth. Lennox also played at the 2019 Paris Sevens. Lennox again was in the Ireland squad in June 2019 for a Europe regional qualifying tournament for the 2020 Summer Olympics.
Lennox also played for Ireland during the 2019-20 World Rugby Sevens Series.
In 2022, He competed for Ireland at the Rugby World Cup Sevens in Cape Town.

In addition to rugby sevens, Lennox has also played rugby fifteens with Skerries and with Barnhall and Clontarf in the All-Ireland League.

References

External links
 Hugo Lennox at Irish Rugby Football Union
 
 
 
 

1999 births
Irish rugby union players
Living people
Place of birth missing (living people)
Rugby sevens players
Olympic rugby sevens players of Ireland
Rugby sevens players at the 2020 Summer Olympics